is a bridge located in Chūō-ku in the city of Osaka, Osaka Prefecture, Japan. It crosses over the Higashi Yokobori River and shares its name with the surrounding area.

Naming
The area received the name of "Kōrai" during the Asuka or Nara period, when ancient Japan was in close contact with kingdoms on the Korean Peninsula. The envoy to Korea was called komanomuratsumi (高麗館) and when Toyotomi Hideyoshi was dividing up the areas within Osaka, he chose those same kanji.

Neighboring post towns
Ōsaka Kaidō
Moriguchi-juku - Kōraibashi (ending location)

Stations of the Tōkaidō
Buildings and structures in Osaka
Transport in Osaka Prefecture